The Glenwood Community School District is a rural public school district based in Glenwood, Iowa.  The district is mainly in western Mills County, on the western border of Iowa, with a very small area in southern Pottawattamie County.  The district serves the towns of Glenwood, Pacific Junction, and Silver City, the unincorporated village of Mineola, and the surrounding rural areas,

The school's mascot is the Rams. Their colors are black and gold.

Schools
The district operates four schools, all in Glenwood:
Northeast Elementary School
West Elementary School
Glenwood Middle School
Glenwood Senior High School

Glenwood High School

Athletics
The Rams compete in the Hawkeye 10 Conference in the following sports:

Fall Sports
Football
Cross Country (boys and girls)
Volleyball

Winter Sports
Boys Basketball
2018 Class 3A State Champions
Girls Basketball
Bowling
Wrestling

Spring Sports
Golf (boys and girls)
 Soccer (boys and girls)
Tennis (boys and girls)
Track and Field (boys and girls)

Summer Sports
Baseball
 2010 Class 3A State Champions
Softball

See also
List of school districts in Iowa
List of high schools in Iowa

References

External links
 Glenwood Community School District

Education in Mills County, Iowa
Education in Pottawattamie County, Iowa
School districts in Iowa